Souk El Arbaa (Berber: ⵙⵓⵇ ⵍⴰⵔⴱⵄⴰ) is a town in Kénitra Province, Rabat-Salé-Kénitra, Morocco. In the 2014 Moroccan census it recorded a population of 69,265. According to the 2004 census it had a population of 43,392.

References

Populated places in Kénitra Province
Municipalities of Morocco